The  was a two-ship class of pre-dreadnought battleships built for the Imperial Japanese Navy (IJN) in the early 1900s. As Japan lacked the industrial capacity to build such warships itself, they were designed and built in the UK. They were the last pre-dreadnought battleships to be built for Japan at overseas shipyards, and the last to be equipped with a ram. The ships were delivered after the end of the Russo-Japanese War of 1904–1905. They saw no action during World War I, although both were present when Japan joined the Siberian Intervention in 1918. They were disarmed and scrapped in 1923–1925 in accordance with the terms of the Washington Naval Treaty of 1922.

Design and description
The Katori-class ships were ordered under the 1903 Third Fleet Extension Program. As with the earlier battleships, Japan lacked the technology and capability to construct its own battleships, and turned again to the United Kingdom, placing orders with Armstrong and Vickers in January 1904.

The design of the Katori class  was a modified and improved version of the s of the Royal Navy. The Vickers-built  was slightly smaller than her sister ship, . They displaced  at normal load. The crew consisted of 864 officers and enlisted men.

Propulsion
The ships were powered by a pair of four-cylinder vertical triple-expansion steam engines, each driving one propeller, using steam generated by 20 Niclausse boilers using a mixture of coal and fuel oil.

Armament
The armament of the Katori class ships differed due to being built by competing shipyards. Kashima had Armstrong-built guns, while Katori had Vickers-built guns. The primary armament of both ships was four 45-caliber 12-inch (305 mm) guns in twin-gun turrets fore and aft of the ships superstructure. Kashima had four EOC 12-inch Type 41 guns, while Katori had four Vickers 12-inch Type 41 guns.

The secondary armament of the King Edward VII class introduced an intermediate caliber of  guns between the primary 12-inch guns and the tertiary 6-inch guns and the Japanese upgraded these to 45-caliber 10-inch (254 mm) guns in four single turrets mounted at the corners of the superstructure. Kashima had four EOC 10-inch Type 41 guns, while Katori had four Vickers 10-inch Type 41 guns. The guns had a muzzle velocity of  when firing  shells.

The tertiary armament of both ships was twelve 45-caliber 6-inch (152 mm) guns, compared to the ten of the King Edward VIIs. Kashima had twelve EOC 6-inch Type 41 guns, while Katori had twelve Vickers 6-inch Type 41 guns. Ten of these guns were mounted in the hull and the remaining two were placed in the superstructure between the 10-inch gun turrets.

Protection against torpedo boat attacks was provided by twelve to sixteen QF 12-pounder 12-cwt guns and three  QF three-pounder Hotchkiss guns. The ships were also equipped with five submerged 18-inch torpedo tubes, two on each broadside and one in the stern.

Armor
It had a maximum thickness of  amidships. It was only  inches thick at the ends of the ship and was surmounted by a six-inch,  strake of armour that ran between the main gun barbettes and protected most of the secondary guns. The sides of the superstructure between the intermediate barbettes had  of armour.

This significantly improved the ships' protection as any shell that penetrated their vertical armour also had to penetrate the sloping deck before it could reach the machinery compartments or magazines. The conning tower was protected by nine inches of armour.

Ships

Service
Whilst conducting gunnery training in Hiroshima Bay on 16 September 1907, brown powder propellant in Kashimas starboard rear 10-inch gun mount ignited when it came in contact with burning residue from the previous shot. The fire killed seven officers and 27 enlisted men; wounding two officers and six enlisted men. When World War I began, Kashima was refitting while Katori was assigned to the 1st Battleship Squadron. The former was assigned to the 2nd Battleship Squadron when her refit was completed in 1915 and became the squadron's flagship in 1916. Katori began a refit in 1914 that lasted until late 1916 and was assigned to the 5th Battleship Squadron upon its completion. Kashima joined her sister in the 5th Battleship Squadron as its flagship in 1918 and both ships covered the landing of Japanese troops in Siberia in August of that year as Japan decided to intervene in the Russian Civil War.

In 1921, Katori, escorted by Kashima, carried Crown Prince Hirohito on his tour of Europe where he met King George V. Both ships were disarmed in 1923 and later scrapped to comply with the terms of the Washington Naval Treaty. All of their guns were turned over to the Imperial Japanese Army for use as coastal artillery; two of Katoris main-gun turrets were installed around Tokyo Bay and on Iki Island in the Strait of Tsushima. The rest of their guns were placed in reserve and scrapped in 1943.

Notes

Footnotes

References

External links

 Materials of the Imperial Japanese Navy

Battleship classes